Belotelson is a genus of crustaceans, in the extinct order Belotelsonidea, containing at least two species. It was first named by Packard in 1886 from material found in the Mazon Creek lagerstätte in Illinois. Its fossils have been found in Pennsylvanian age rocks.

References

External links

Prehistoric Malacostraca
Prehistoric crustacean genera
Carboniferous crustaceans
Fossils of the United States
Carboniferous animals of North America
Taxa named by Alpheus Spring Packard